Barbara Anne Cosens is an American Distinguished University professor at the University of Idaho College of Law.

Early life and education
Cosens was born and raised in Sierra Nevada, California, and earned her bachelor's degree from the University of California, Davis. She would later earn her Master's degree from the University of Washington and her J.D. from the University of California, Hastings College of Law.

Career
In 2002, Cosens joined the College of Behavioral and Social Sciences at San Francisco State University (SFSU) as an assistant professor of environmental studies. She spent two years at SFSU before joining the University of Idaho College of Law as a full-time permanent faculty member. By the 2009–2010 academic term, she received tenure from the university. A few years later, she accepted a visiting scholar position at the University of New Mexico School of Law to focus on water resources management. In 2014, Cosens edited a book titled the "Columbia River Treaty Revisited: Transboundary River Governance in the Face of Uncertainty" which examined the Columbia River Treaty.

After earning tenure, Cosens co-founded the Social-ecological System Resilience, Climate Change, & Adaptive Water Governance project with Lance Gunderson. By 2015, Cosens received a visiting professorship with Flinders University to study water policy and management. Her acceptance was, in part, based on her Social-ecological System Resilience, Climate Change, & Adaptive Water Governance project which focused on law regarding adaptive water governance. The following year, she co-published an article with Craig Allen from the University of Nebraska–Lincoln titled "Avoiding Decline: Fostering Resilience and Sustainability in Midsize Cities," which focused on the Inland Northwest. On October 5, 2016, Cosens joined researchers at Washington State University to study water management and how law treats in-stream flows and water transfers.

On April 18, 2018, Cosens was promoted to the rank of University Distinguished Professor. During the same year, she completed her co-founded Social-ecological System Resilience, Climate Change, & Adaptive Water Governance project and published the results in a book called "Practical Panarchy for Adaptive Water Governance: Linking Law to Social-Ecological Resilience."

References

External links

CV

Living people
San Francisco State University faculty
University of Idaho faculty
University of California, Davis alumni
University of Washington alumni
Lewis & Clark Law School alumni
University of California, Hastings College of the Law alumni
Academic journal editors
American women legal scholars
American legal scholars
Year of birth missing (living people)